Rhoda Nakibuuka Nsibirwa Kalema (born May 1929) is a retired Ugandan female politician known as the country's "Mother of Parliament".

Early life
Rhoda Kalema was one of 24 children of Martin Luther Nsibirwa, who was twice appointed Katikkiro (Prime Minister) of the Kingdom of Buganda in Uganda.  She was born in May 1929 in the Butikkiro, the official residence of the Katikkiro, in the Mengo neighbourhood of Kampala.

Kalema attended Gayaza Junior School for a year, and then King's College Budo for the remainder of her primary and secondary schooling. She enrolled for a commercial course in secretarial training, and worked as secretary and bursar at Gayaza High School until 1949. In 1950, she married William Kalema, a teacher at King's College Budo who later became a renowned politician and Government Minister of Commerce. In 1955 she commenced a one year course in Social Work and Social Administration at Newbattle Abbey, an Adult Education College in the United Kingdom, followed by a Diploma in Social Studies at the University of Edinburgh.

Political career 
In 1961, Grace Ibingira and Adoko Nyekon initiated Rhoda Kalema into the Uganda People's Congress. She was a junior minister of Culture and Community Development in Binaisa's regime. However, after the death of her husband in 1972—he was abducted and killed during Idi Amin's regime—she gave up political participation until 1979 when, after Idi Amin's downfall, she joined the National Consultative Council (NCC) formed by the Uganda National Liberation Front under Edward Rugumayo, as one of two female representatives. In 1980 she was one of the founding members of the Uganda Patriotic Movement (UPM).

She was arrested three times by the State Research Bureau: on January 23, 1979; on February 21, 1981 (when she and other politicians were arrested after numerous attacks on police stations) and on February 4, 1983.

She became Deputy Minister of Public Service from 1989 until 1991 under President Yoweri Museveni. In 1994, she stood for the Constituent Assembly elections as the Kiboga representative, and defeated 8 male opponents after scooping two thirds of the entire vote. She later retired from politics after grooming a number of notable politicians such as Ruth Nankabirwa, the Chief Whip in Uganda's Cabinet.

Rhoda Kalema was honoured in 1996 by Uganda's Forum for Women in Democracy "as a transformative leader". On March 13, 2018, she received the Sudreau Global Justice Lifetime Achievement Award from the Pepperdine University School of Law and the Ugandan Judiciary.

See also 

 Parliament of Uganda
 Butikkiro
 Ruth Nankabirwa

External links 

 Website of the Parliament of Uganda

References 

1929 births
Living people
20th-century Ugandan women politicians
20th-century Ugandan politicians
Uganda People's Congress politicians